Mike Morris is a Canadian politician, who was elected to the Legislative Assembly of British Columbia in the 2013 provincial election. He represents the electoral district of Prince George-Mackenzie as a member of the British Columbia Liberal Party.

Morris has been chair of the Special Committee to Review the Independent Investigations Office, the convener of the Select Standing Committee of Crown Corporations, and has served on other Selected Standing Committees including Finance and Government Services and Public Accounts, along with the Cabinet Committee for Environment and Land Use.

Before being elected to the B.C. Legislature on May 14, 2013, Morris had a 32-year career in the Royal Canadian Mounted Police (RCMP). He retired in 2005 as the Superintendent for the North District. He has also been an adjudicator and mediator with the Health Professions Review Board, has served on the Drug Benefit Council for BC since 2009, and is the Past President of the BC Trappers Association. He spent the majority of his RCMP career in northern communities. He and his wife Chris have been married for more than 35 years. They have two sons and five grandchildren.

In December 2015, Premier Christy Clark appointed him to be Minister of Public Safety and Solicitor General after the position was vacant since the duties were combined with the Ministry of Justice in 2012.

Electoral record

References

British Columbia Liberal Party MLAs
Living people
21st-century Canadian politicians
Members of the Executive Council of British Columbia
Solicitors general of Canadian provinces
Year of birth missing (living people)